The Conejo Formation (K2C, Kscn) is a fossiliferous geological formation of the Altiplano Cundiboyacense, Eastern Ranges of the Colombian Andes.

Etymology 
The formation was named in 1967 and published in 1981 by Renzoni, named after El Conejo Hill in Pontezuela, Toca, Boyacá, west of the Copa Reservoir.

Description

Lithologies 
The Conejo Formation is characterised by a sequence of calcareous sandstones, containing ammonites, shales and the uppermost part sandstone and limestone banks. In the Conejo Formation, fossils of Protopholoe colombiana, Archaeglobigerina blowi, Dicarinella concavata, Dicarinella primitiva, Sigalitruncana sigali, Marginotruncana sp. ct. M. renzi, Marginotruncana angusticarenata, Marginotruncana sp. cf. M.sinuosa, Rosita tornicata, Heterohelix globulosa, Heterohelix reussi, Whiteinella inornata, Hedbergella sp., and the ammonites Gloriaceras correai, Protexamites cucaitaense and Codazziceras scheibei have been found.

Stratigraphy and depositional environment 
The Conejo Formation is the uppermost unit of the Villeta Group. It overlies the La Frontera Formation and is overlain by the Guadalupe Group. The age has been estimated on the basis of ammonites to be ranging from Turonian to Santonian. Stratigraphically, the lower part of the formation is time equivalent with the upper part of the Chipaque, and Loma Gorda Formations.

Outcrops 

The type locality of the Conejo Formation is located close to El Conejo Hill in Pontezuela, Toca, Boyacá. Other outcrops of the Conejo Formation have been noted in Cucaita, the urban areas of Boyacá and Ventaquemada, around the Puente de Boyacá, south of Pesca, west of Siachoque, surrounding Chiquinquirá and Ubaté,  between Chivatá and Oicatá, east of Paipa, west of Tibacuy, north and south of Albán, southeast of Cachipay, east of Anolaima, and San Antonio del Tequendama, Cundinamarca.

Regional correlations

See also 

 Geology of the Eastern Hills
 Geology of the Ocetá Páramo
 Geology of the Altiplano Cundiboyacense

References

Bibliography

Maps

External links 
 

Geologic formations of Colombia
Cretaceous Colombia
Upper Cretaceous Series of South America
Turonian Stage
Coniacian Stage
Santonian Stage
Shale formations
Sandstone formations
Fossiliferous stratigraphic units of South America
Paleontology in Colombia
Formations
Formations
Formations